Arrochar was a station on the demolished South Beach Branch of the Staten Island Railway. It had two side platforms and two tracks and was located at Major Avenue. The station was able to platform two train cars.

History
This station was abandoned when the SIRT discontinued passenger service on the South Beach Branch to Wentworth Avenue at midnight on March 31, 1953, because of city-operated bus competition. The station was fully demolished when the toll plaza of the Verrazano Narrows Bridge was built near the same location. Only one staircase that led to the station remained by 1963, as the rest of the station was covered by displaced dirt coming from the construction of the approach to the Verrazano Bridge. The location where McClean Avenue used to bridge over the right-of-way, which was built in 1936, has been filled in some time after 1964 for the construction of houses along the right-of-way, and the bridge can still be detected by the cement in the middle of McClean Avenue.

References

External links
http://www.gretschviking.net/GOSIRTPage1.htm

South Beach Branch stations
1886 establishments in New York (state)
Railway stations in the United States opened in 1886
Railway stations closed in 1953
1953 disestablishments in New York (state)